Umangi is a village on the right bank of the Congo River downstream from Lisala in the Mongala province of the Democratic Republic of the Congo.

History

Umangi was among the posts founded in 1888–1889 by a Belgian expedition led by Francis Dhanis.

Notes

Sources

Populated places in Tshopo